The 1983 East Carolina Pirates football team was an American football team that represented East Carolina University as an independent during the 1983 NCAA Division I-A football season. In their fourth season under head coach Ed Emory, the team compiled a 8–3 record.

Schedule

References

East Carolina
East Carolina Pirates football seasons
East Carolina Pirates football